Seyed Hadi Panzvan Langroudi (born December 12, 1975) is an Iranian weightlifter who won the silver medal in the Men's 85 kg weight class at the 2002 Asian Games.

Major results

References

External links
 
  (archive)

1975 births
Living people
Iranian male weightlifters
Iranian strength athletes
Asian Games silver medalists for Iran
Asian Games medalists in weightlifting
Weightlifters at the 2002 Asian Games
Medalists at the 2002 Asian Games
21st-century Iranian people